Lisbeth Seierskilde (born 5 December 1985 in Roskilde, Denmark) is a Danish Olympic dressage rider. She competed at the 2012 Summer Olympics in London, where she placed 34th in the individual competition.

Seierskilde also competed at the 2011 European Championships in Rotterdam, where she finished 6th in the team, 14th in the freestyle and 15th in the special dressage competition.

References

Living people
1985 births
Danish female equestrians
Danish dressage riders
Equestrians at the 2012 Summer Olympics
Olympic equestrians of Denmark
People from Roskilde
Sportspeople from Region Zealand